The Little Shepherd of Kingdom Come is an American CinemaScope Western film directed by Andrew V. McLaglen. It stars Jimmie Rodgers and Luana Patten and includes the film debut of George Kennedy.

It is based on the 1903 novel of the same title by John Fox Jr., which had previously been filmed in 1920, directed by Wallace Worsley and starring Jack Pickford, and again in 1928, directed by Alfred Santell and starring Richard Barthelmess.

Plot

Chad (Jimmie Rodgers) is a confused young man growing up in 1860s Kentucky. Sheltered from his brutal guardian by a friendly schoolmaster, he learns to love the tiny village of Kingdom Come and has no inclination of leaving. But when the American Civil War breaks out, he finds himself at odds with most of his friends by joining the Union Army. His wartime experiences force Chad to grow up in a hurry, and he returns to Kingdom Come with a whole new outlook on his future existence.

Cast
 Jimmie Rodgers as Chad
 Luana Patten as Melissa Turner
 Chill Wills as Major Buford
 Linda Hutchings as Margaret Dean
 Robert Dix as Caleb Turner
 George Kennedy as Nathan Dillon
 Ken Miller as Reuben
 Neil Hamilton as Gen. Dean
 Shirley O'Hara as Mrs. Turner
 Lois January as Mrs. Dean

Production
The film was made by Robert L. Lippert's production company but was released as a 20th Century Fox production as opposed to the Regal Films logo, which they occasionally did.

Filming started September 1960.

References

External links
 
 
 
 

1961 films
Films directed by Andrew McLaglen
Films based on American novels
Films set in Appalachia
Films set in Kentucky
American Civil War films
Remakes of American films
American Western (genre) films
1961 Western (genre) films
Sound film remakes of silent films
20th Century Fox films
CinemaScope films
1960s English-language films
1960s American films